Saulo Squarsone Rodrigues dos Santos (born 10 August 1985), simply known as Saulo, is a Brazilian professional footballer who plays as a goalkeeper for Ferroviária.

Career
He formerly played in Brazil for Criciúma, Santos and ADAP. In November 2006, he sue Santos to release from the contract.

On 31 August 2007, he was signed by Udinese.
On 22 July 2008, he joined AlbinoLeffe from Udinese in a co-ownership deal.

In July 2009 AlbinoLeffe terminated his contract by mutual consent.

In December 2010 he joined Americana on a 2-year contract.

His loan with Vila Nova ended early in May 2019, and he returned to parent club Botafogo-PB.

References

External links
 
 
 Profile at globo.com
 CBF

Association football goalkeepers
Footballers from São Paulo (state)
1985 births
Living people
Brazilian footballers
Brazilian expatriate footballers
Expatriate footballers in Italy
Brazilian expatriate sportspeople in Italy
Santos FC players
Udinese Calcio players
U.C. AlbinoLeffe players
Ituano FC players
Guaratinguetá Futebol players
Bonsucesso Futebol Clube players
Esporte Clube Santo André players
Associação Desportiva São Caetano players
Red Bull Brasil players
Figueirense FC players
Botafogo Futebol Clube (PB) players
Associação Ferroviária de Esportes players
Associação Chapecoense de Futebol players
Campeonato Brasileiro Série A players
Campeonato Brasileiro Série B players
Campeonato Brasileiro Série C players
Campeonato Brasileiro Série D players
People from Salto, São Paulo